Harussani bin Zakaria (8 April 1939 – 30 May 2021) was a Malaysian Islamic ulama who served as the eighth Mufti of Perak (1985 – 2021).

Early life and education
Harussani was born on 8 April 1939 in Parit Tok Ngah, Tanjung Piandang, Parit Buntar, Perak. He received his education at the Anglo Chinese School and later at Kolej Islam Malaya Klang.

Career and positions
Harussani began his career as Kadi at the Religious Department of Penang from 1967 until 1973, before being promoted to Head Kadi from 1973 to 1985. He became the Mufti of Perak from 1985 until his death in 2021. He had also held several positions at both state and federal level including the chairman of the Censorship of Islamic Publications committee, Al Quran Text Board deputy chairman and member of the National Fatwa Council.

Personal life
Harussani was married to Ainon Abdul Ghani and the couple have five children. Their son, Abdul Hakam, died at the age of 23 in a road accident in Egypt in 1994.

Death 
Harussani had a stroke in August 2020, and his health had deteriorated since. He and his wife were diagnosed with COVID-19 on 11 May 2021, and were treated at intensive care unit (ICU) of the Raja Permaisuri Bainun Hospital (HRPB), Ipoh. His wife, however, recovered enough to be discharged to recuperate at home.

Harussani aged 82 died in hospital on 30 May 2021, from COVID-19. The Perak mufti's office confirmed Harussani's death on its official website. Harussani was laid to rest at the Kampung Rapat Jaya Muslim Cemetery at 6.20 p.m.

Honours 
  :
  Companion of the Order of Loyalty to the Crown of Malaysia (JSM) (1994)
  Commander of the Order of Loyalty to the Crown of Malaysia (PSM) – Tan Sri (2009)
  :
  Knight Commander of the Order of the Perak State Crown (DPMP) – Dato' (1986)
  Knight Grand Commander of the Order of the Perak State Crown (SPMP) – Dato' Seri (1999)
  Grand Knight of the Azlanii Royal Family Order (DSA) – Dato' Seri (2009)

Honorary degrees
  :
 Honorary Ph.D. degree in Shariah from University Malaya (2001)

Publication
 Memoir Harussani Zakaria : Dia Akan Jadi Mufti (2018)

See also
 List of deaths due to COVID-19 - notable individual deaths

References

1939 births
2021 deaths
People from Perak
Malaysian people of Malay descent
Malaysian people of Banjar descent
Malaysian Muslims
Muftis in Malaysia
Sunni Muslim scholars of Islam
Commanders of the Order of Loyalty to the Crown of Malaysia
Companions of the Order of Loyalty to the Crown of Malaysia
Deaths from the COVID-19 pandemic in Malaysia
21st-century Malaysian politicians